In the 1954 Wimbledon Championships – Gentlemen's Singles competition, Jaroslav Drobný defeated Ken Rosewall in the final, 13–11, 4–6, 6–2, 9–7 to take the gentlemen's singles tennis title. It was Drobný's third singles final and second win at Wimbledon. Vic Seixas was the defending champion, but lost in the quarterfinals to Budge Patty.

It was the first of 19-year-old Rosewall's Wimbledon singles finals, all of which he lost. This resulted in Rosewall being considered by many to be the greatest player never to win Wimbledon.

Progress of the competition
Jaroslav Drobný, who was 32 at the time of the competition, was Czech-born but was said to play "like an Englishman". Drobný was extremely popular with British tennis fans, and no British player had made it to the 1954 quarterfinals, the longest-surviving home player in the men's singles being 18-year-old Mike Davies, who was knocked out in the fourth round by Budge Patty. The Daily Herald reported that nearly everyone wanted to see Drobný win the title. No unseeded players made it to the quarterfinals, the stage at which second-seeded Lew Hoad was knocked out in straight sets by Drobný. Top seed Tony Trabert was defeated in the semifinal by Rosewall.

Seeds

  Tony Trabert (semifinals)
  Lew Hoad (quarterfinals)
  Ken Rosewall (final)
  Vic Seixas (quarterfinals)
  Mervyn Rose (quarterfinals)
  Art Larsen (third round)
  Budge Patty (semifinals)
  Rex Hartwig (quarterfinals)
  Sven Davidson (fourth round)
  Kurt Nielsen (fourth round)
  Jaroslav Drobný (champion)
  Gardnar Mulloy (fourth round)

Draw

Finals

Top half

Section 1

Section 2

Section 3

Section 4

Bottom half

Section 5

Section 6

Section 7

Section 8

References

External links

Men's Singles
Wimbledon Championship by year – Men's singles